Glendower may refer to:

Glendower State Memorial, a historic house in Lebanon, Ohio
Shandon, Ohio, which was originally called Glendower
 Glendower, Virginia
 Glendower as featured in The Raven Cycle

See also
Owen Glendower (disambiguation)